The Youngstown Kitchen Trumbull Open was a golf tournament on the LPGA Tour, played only in 1960. It was played at the Trumbull Country Club in Warren, Ohio. Louise Suggs won the event.

References

Former LPGA Tour events
Golf in Ohio
Warren, Ohio
1960 establishments in Ohio
1960 disestablishments in Ohio
1960 in sports in Ohio
History of women in Ohio